Ko Korsten (2 May 1895 – 3 October 1981) was a Dutch swimmer. He competed in the men's 100 metre freestyle event at the 1920 Summer Olympics.

References

External links
 

1895 births
1981 deaths
Olympic swimmers of the Netherlands
Swimmers at the 1920 Summer Olympics
Swimmers from Amsterdam
Dutch male freestyle swimmers
19th-century Dutch people
20th-century Dutch people